Ambrose Phillipps (c. 1707 – 6 November 1737), of Garendon Park, Leicestershire,  was an English landowner and Tory politician who sat in the House of Commons from 1734 to 1737. He was also an amateur architect.

Phillipps was the eldest son of William Phillipps of Garendon and his wife Jane Dashwood, daughter of Sir Samuel Dashwood, MP, who was Lord mayor of London in 1703. He matriculated at Magdalen College, Oxford on 18 July 1724, aged 16. He succeeded his father to Garendon in 1729 and then  travelled in France and Italy, where he acquired an interest in architecture. He applied his  knowledge of architecture in designing the gardens and extensions of Garendon Hall. He was an early member of the Society of Dilettanti in around 1732.

Phillipps  was returned unopposed as Tory Member of Parliament (MP) for Leicestershire at a by-election on 5 February 1734, and was returned unopposed again at the 1734 British general election soon after. He voted against the Government on the repeal of the Septennial Act.
 
Phillipps died unmarried on 6 November 1737, aged 30. Garendon Hall was completed by his brother.

References

Mark Aironard "Ambrose Phillipps of Garendon", Architectural History, 1965

1700s births
1737 deaths
Members of the Parliament of Great Britain for Leicestershire
British MPs 1727–1734
British MPs 1734–1741
People from the Borough of Charnwood
Place of birth missing